Human Resources Development Fund commonly known by the acronym HRDF is a Malaysian Statutory Body under the Ministry of Human Resources.

HRDF is governed by the Human Resources Development Act 1992 (currently known as Pembangunan Sumber Manusia Berhad Act 2001(PSMB)).

References

Government agencies of Malaysia